The 1926 Montana State Bobcats football team represented Montana State College (later renamed Montana State University) in the Rocky Mountain Conference (RMC) during the 1926 college football season. In its fifth season under head coach G. Ott Romney, the team compiled a 4–2–1 record (4–0 against RMC opponents), finished second in the conference, and outscored opponents by a total of 52 to 43.

Schedule

References

Montana State
Montana State Bobcats football seasons
Montana State Bobcats football